The Sadid-345, also known simply as the Sadid guided bomb is an Iranian precision-guided glide bomb with a fragmentation warhead.

The Sadid-345 is meant for use on UCAVs. Its main launch platform is the Shahed 129.

Specifications 

The bomb weighs 34 kg and is 1.63 meters long, with a diameter of 152 mm. It has four fixed fins on the body for lift and stability and four deflectable fins on the tail for trajectory control. The bomb has a range of 6 km and is made of composite material.

The Sadid-345 warhead is filled with composition H6 explosive and is prefragmented, with a specified lethal radius of 30 m. It is detonated by an impact fuse.

There is the possibility that Sadid-345 glide bombs could be developed with tandem-warheads, but as of the present there is no evidence of this.

The Sadid-345 can be equipped with an infrared seeker, with CEP of 2.5 meters, a laser seeker with a CEP of 2.5 m, or a visual light seeker with a CEP of 5 m (though the CEP may be larger if there is difficulty with the image processing).

Operational history

Development 
The Sadid-345 was developed after the intended armament for Iran's Shahed 129 UAV, the Sadid-1 ATGM, could not be successfully integrated for unclear reasons.

It is believed the Sadid-345 was developed from the Toophan through removal of the engine, propulsion system, and wire guidance components.

Use
The IRGC is the only purchaser of the Sadid-345, as of 2018. "Tens" of Sadid-345 bombs have been dropped on the Islamic State in Syria by Shahed 129s.

It can also be integrated on HESA Shahed 285 attack helicopters.

Launch platforms 
 Shahed 129
 HESA Shahed 285

References 

Guided bombs
Aerial bombs of Iran
Military equipment introduced in the 2010s